In the theory of finite population sampling, a sampling design specifies for every possible sample its probability of being drawn.

Mathematical formulation
Mathematically, a sampling design is denoted by the function  which gives the probability of drawing a sample

An example of a sampling design 
During Bernoulli sampling,  is given by

Sample design for managerial research 
In business research, companies must often generate samples of customers, clients, employees, and so forth to gather their opinions. Sample design is also a critical component of marketing research and employee research for many organizations. During sample design, firms must answer questions such as:
 What is the relevant population, sampling frame, and sampling unit?
 What is the appropriate margin of error that should be achieved?
 How should sampling error and non-sampling error be assessed and balanced?

These issues require very careful consideration, and good commentaries are provided in several sources.

See also 
 Bernoulli sampling
 Sampling probability
 Sampling (statistics)

References

Further reading 
 Sarndal, Swenson, and Wretman (1992), Model Assisted Survey Sampling, Springer-Verlag, 

Sampling (statistics)